Robert Lazier (December 22, 1938 – April 18, 2020) was an American race car driver.

Biography
A native of Minneapolis, Minnesota, he raced in the CART series in 1981 and was CART's Rookie of the Year. He had fourth-place finishes at Watkins Glen International and Mexico. Lazier also competed in the 1981 Indianapolis 500, finishing 19th after a blown engine caused him to retire the Penske PC-7 after 154 laps. He was married to wife Diane and was the father of both 1996 Indianapolis 500 winner Buddy Lazier and Indy Racing League driver Jaques Lazier. And Current Indy Lights driver Flinn Lazier

Lazier competed in Formula 5000 in the 1970s. In 2015, Lazier won the Indy Legends Charity Pro–Am race with co-driver Jim Caudle.

He built the Tivoli Lodge in Vail, Colorado, in 1968.

Lazier died on April 18, 2020, in Denver, Colorado, from COVID-19 during the COVID-19 pandemic in Colorado. He was 81.

Racing record

SCCA National Championship Runoffs

American Open Wheel racing results
(key)

Formula Super Vee

Complete USAC Mini-Indy Series results

CART

Indianapolis 500

References

External links

1938 births
2020 deaths
Champ Car drivers
Indianapolis 500 drivers
Trans-Am Series drivers
Racing drivers from Minneapolis
Racing drivers from Minnesota
Sportspeople from Minneapolis
People from Vail, Colorado
SCCA National Championship Runoffs winners
SCCA Formula Super Vee drivers
Formula Super Vee Champions
IndyCar Series team owners
Deaths from the COVID-19 pandemic in Colorado